Edgar Gowar Ritchie (15 July 1871–23 July 1956) was a hydraulic engineer who worked for the Melbourne & Metropolitan Board of Works for the majority of his career.  He was the engineer of water supply from 1908 until his retirement in 1936.  In this role he was responsible for the construction of the Maroondah, O'Shannassy and Silvan reservoirs and their associated aqueducts. In 1943, Ritchie was awarded the Peter Nicol Russell Memorial Medal from the Institution of Engineers Australia.

References

1871 births
1956 deaths
Engineers from Melbourne
Australian civil engineers
People from Kew, Victoria